Emery Unified School District is a small public school district in Emeryville, California, United States, in the San Francisco Bay Area.

Campuses
The district currently operates two schools, Anna Yates Elementary school and Emery Secondary School. Previously the schools had separate campuses, but they are now closed. The schools moved  to a shared campus in August 2016 at the newly constructed state-of-the-art facility called Emeryville Center for Community Life. Also sharing the ECCL site are the Emery Unified School District Office, a community health center, and city of Emeryville community and recreation spaces.

 the East Bay campus of the German International School of Silicon Valley occupies the ex-Anna Yates School. This campus will close after spring 2018 and reorganize into a separate school, called the East Bay German International School.

Programs
The Oakland Raiders annually visit a fourth grade class to encourage the students to work smarter, not harder.

Demographics
Over 50% of females and about 50% of males in grades 2-6 were rated "proficient" and above on CST STAR testing for the 2010–2011 school year in mathematics. Over 40% of females and over 35% of males were proficient or above in English-Language Arts.

For grades 7–11 in the 2010–2011 school year, over 30% of females and 25% of males were proficient or above in English-Language Arts.

The student body is 70% African American, 14% Hispanic American, 11% Asian American, and 5% Caucasian and Pacific Islanders. 4.8% live in poverty and 4% are English learners.

References

External links
 

School districts in Alameda County, California
Emeryville, California